John Major (born 8 August 1940) is a former New Zealand rugby union player. A hooker, Major represented  at a provincial level, and was a member of the New Zealand national side, the All Blacks, between 1963 and 1967. He played 24 matches for the All Blacks including one international.

References

1940 births
Living people
Rugby union players from Whakatāne
People educated at Waitara High School
New Zealand rugby union players
New Zealand international rugby union players
Taranaki rugby union players
Rugby union hookers